The Hits+ Collection 86-09: Right Back Where We Started From is the first greatest hits album by American-British singer Sinitta, released on 19 October 2009.

Track listing 
CD 1
 So Macho
 Feels Like The First Time
 Toy Boy
 G.T.O.
 Cross My Broken Heart
 I Don't Believe In Miracles
 Right Back Where We Started From
 Love On A Mountain Top
 Lay Me Down Easy
 Hitchin' A Ride
 Love And Affection
 Shame Shame Shame
 Where Did Our Love Go
 How Can This Be Real Love (7" Mix) (previously unreleased)
 Do You Wanna Find Out (12" Mix ) (previously unreleased)
 Hitchin' A Ride (PWL 7" Mix) (previously unreleased)
 Body Shopping (Pete Hammond HI-NRG Remix) (previously unreleased)
 I Don't Believe In Miracles (Merlin's New Hit Mix) (rare)
 Shame Shame Shame (Alternative 12" Mix) (previously unreleased)
 The Day You Say Goodbye (new recording)
 Toy Boy (Reloaded) (new recording)

CD 2
 Toy Boy (The Original Mix) (rare)
 G.T.O. (Modina's Red Roaring Mix) (rare)
 Cross My Broken Heart (12" Euro Remix) (previously unreleased)
 I Don't Believe In Miracles (Club Remix) (rare)
 Right Back Where We Started From (Left Back On The Side Mix) (rare)
 Love On A Mountain Top (Promo 12" Mix) (previously unreleased)
 Hitchin' A Ride (PWL Remix) (rare)
 How Can This Be Real Love (12" Mix) (previously unreleased)
 Body Shopping (Original 12" Mix) (previously unreleased)
 I Just Wanna Spend Some Time With You (12" Mix) (previously unreleased)
 You Keep Me Hanging On (12" Mix) (previously unreleased)
 The Day You Said Goodbye(Pete Hammond's Empire Strikes Back Mix) (new recording)

Release history

References

External links
Official website

Sinitta albums
2009 greatest hits albums
2009 remix albums
Sony Music remix albums
Sony Music compilation albums